Smardzów  is a village in the administrative district of Gmina Siechnice, within Wrocław County, Lower Silesian Voivodeship, in south-western Poland. Prior to 1945 it was in Germany, and was known under the name of Smarsch.

The village has a population of 200.

References

Villages in Wrocław County